The MAN SG 220 was a VöV-Standard articulated bus designed and manufactured by Maschinenfabrik Augsburg-Nürnberg (M.A.N.) in Germany between 1978 and 1983, available with two, three, or four doors in two different lengths. The bus was also exported to different countries, built locally in France, Slovenia, Turkey, and the United States.

In the American market, in order to meet Urban Mass Transportation Administration "Buy America" requirements for federally-subsidized vehicles, the initial set of vehicles were shipped as driveable shells and finished in the United States by AM General in Texas until 1979. After the joint venture with AM General ended, M.A.N. opened its own assembly plant in Cleveland, North Carolina to produce the SG 220 and its closely related derivative SG 310 (starting in 1981) until it abruptly withdrew from the United States transit bus market in 1988.

Design
The full model number describes the type, generation, length, and number of doors:

Potential door locations are (from the front proceeding to the back):
 Ahead of the front axle, behind the windshield
 Ahead of the middle axle
 Behind the articulation, ahead of the rear axle
 Behind the rear axle

In the United States, the number of doors was limited to two or three, corresponding to locations 1-x-3-x or 1-2-3-x. The SG 310 was offered with two doors, in locations 1-x-3-x.

Both the SG 220 and 310 were high-floor "puller" type articulated buses, with the middle axle driven.

History

United States
The AC Transit District serving Alameda and Contra Costa counties in the San Francisco Bay Area began using an over-the-road articulated coach in Transbay service in 1966; subsequently, AC Transit was one of six transit districts to develop a "super bus" specification in the early 1970s for a higher-capacity bus. A pooled purchase was intended to reduce per-unit development costs. Riders received the M.A.N. bus favorably, and the specification was released for bid in 1975; the pooled purchase consortium, which by then had grown to encompass ten transit districts, awarded the order to AM General in August 1976. Deliveries of the AM General/M.A.N. joint venture SG 220 articulated buses began in 1978.

Buses were shipped from Germany as "driveable shells" and finished by AM General according to customer specifications. AM General terminated the joint venture agreement, taking effect after the delivery of the Seattle Metro buses, and MAN opened a manufacturing plant in Cleveland, North Carolina in October 1981, with an anticipated capacity of 400 buses per year. MAN withdrew from the US transit bus market in 1988 after an order of 40-ft buses for Chicago was blocked by an injunction. The Cleveland plant was sold in 1989 to Daimler subsidiary Freightliner Trucks.

Operators

United States
Several operators in the United States formed a pooled purchase consortium and awarded the bid to the AM General/M.A.N. joint venture (the sole bidder) for over two hundred buses. By March 15, 1982, 511 articulated buses from all manufacturers had been delivered in the United States; of these buses delivered, 399 were MAN/AM General buses. Orders had been placed for an additional 692 articulated buses; of those pending orders, 557 were MAN buses.

Although operating experience with the eleven initial operators showed the per-passenger labor costs of driving the articulated bus were reduced compared with conventional buses, the articulated bus cost was almost double that of a conventional bus, required maintenance was more frequent and more costly, and dwell times were increased.

Notes

Competition
 Crown-Ikarus 286 — In 1982, the only other manufacturer that had delivered an articulated transit bus to a United States transit district was Crown-Ikarus.

References

External links
 
 
 

Articulated buses
MAN buses